The Black shama (Copsychus cebuensis) is a species of bird in the family Muscicapidae.
It is endemic to the island of Cebu, Philippines where it is known locally as "Siloy".

Its natural habitats are subtropical or tropical moist lowland forest, subtropical or tropical moist shrubland, and plantations. It has been sighted in several locations all across the island, the most important sites being the Central Cebu Protected Landscape, the forests of Alcoy and Argao, and the shrublands of Casili, Consolacion.
It is threatened by habitat loss.

Description and taxonomy 
EBird describes the bird as "A medium-sized, long-tailed bird of lowland forest, bamboo, and scrub on Cebu, where it has a preference for valley bottoms. Male is entirely black with a glossy sheen, where the female is sooty gray with a rusty belly. Catches insects on the ground, in the undergrowth, or even on the wing. There are no other species of similar shape and size on Cebu. Song is a series of long, slightly out of tune, often quavering whistles."

Habitat and conservation status 
Its natural habitats are tropical moist lowland primary forest and secondary forests . It is also seen in clearings and plantations as long as there is dense undergrowth. An ongoing radio-tracking study found that the breeding territory in forest-edge habitats was 0.2-0.5 km2.

The IUCN Red List classifies this bird as an endangered species with population estimates of 670 to 3,300 mature individuals with the belief that its population is near the lower estimate of that range. This species' main threat is habitat loss with wholesale clearance of forest habitats as a result of legal and illegal logging, mining and conversion into farmlands through Slash-and-burn and urbanization. Cebu underwent severe deforestation in the 1890s and now just 0.03% or 15 km2 of forest cover remains. Up until today, the forests of Cebu still receive hunting pressure and deforestation — further reducing what little there is remaining.

This has led to many other species sharing its range to also be endangered. It shares habitat with the Cebu flowerpecker, which is one of the most endangered birds in the world and also other endangered species such as the Cebu brown dove, Cebu hawk-owl and Streak-breasted bulbul. This has led to many local extinctions of species such as Cebu warty pig and possibly Cebu amethyst brown dove and local extinctions of Philippine oriole, Blackish cuckooshrike, Bar-bellied cuckooshrike and Philippine hanging parrot.

The black shama occurs in Alcoy, Argao, Dalaguete, Tabunan and Boljoon protected forests, but actual protection and enforcement is lax.

References

External links
BirdLife Species Factsheet.

black shama
Endemic birds of the Philippines
Fauna of Cebu
black shama
black shama
Taxonomy articles created by Polbot
Taxobox binomials not recognized by IUCN